James Corea may refer to:

 James Edward Corea (1865–1955), Ceylonese colonial-era headman
 James Alfred Corea (1871–1915), Ceylonese colonial-era headman
 James A. Corea (1938–2001), radio personality and specialist in nutrition
 James Alfred Ernest Corea, Sri Lankan public official
 J. C. A. Corea (James Clifford Aelian Corea), Sri Lankan educationist

Sinhalese names